Moonlight Serenade is a 2009 musical romance film directed by Giancarlo Tallarico and starring Amy Adams.

Plot summary
A piano player discovers that the girl at the coat-check of a jazz club is a talented singer; she persuades him to form a musical act together.

Cast
Amy Adams as Chloe
Alec Newman as Nate Holden
Harriet Sansom Harris as Angelica Webster
Jeremy Glazer as Gary

External links
 

2009 films
2000s English-language films